Tang-e Zard-e Ashura (also Romanized as Tang-e Zard-e ʿĀshūrā; also known as Tang-e Zard) is a village in Rak Rural District, in the Central District of Kohgiluyeh County, Kohgiluyeh and Boyer-Ahmad Province, Iran. At the 2006 census, its population was 65, in 15 families.

References 

Populated places in Kohgiluyeh County